The New Zealand Warriors are a professional rugby league football club based in Auckland, New Zealand that competes in the National Rugby League (NRL) premiership and is the League's only team from outside Australia. They were formed in 1995 as the Auckland Warriors, and are officially known as the One New Zealand Warriors for sponsorship reasons. The Warriors are coached by Andrew Webster and captained by Tohu Harris. The Warriors are based at Mount Smart Stadium in the Auckland suburb of Penrose.

For the 1995 season the newly formed Auckland Warriors became the first club from outside Australia to be admitted to the Australian Rugby League's premiership when it expanded from 16 to 20 teams. As a result of the Super League war in the mid-1990s, Auckland left the ARL to compete in the Super League competition of 1997, before joining the re-unified NRL the following year. They re-branded themselves the New Zealand Warriors in 2001. The club has yet to win a premiership as of 2022.  They have won one minor premiership (in 2002), and reached two grand finals (2002, 2011), reached the finals eight times

History

The History of the Bid
Rugby league was largely centred around Auckland ever since the New Zealand Rugby League was founded in 1909. Auckland produced the bulk of the international squad for many years, and most of these players headed to either Australia or Great Britain to play.

The Auckland representative side was consistently providing top opposition to touring teams. An Auckland team was admitted into the mid-week ARL Amco Cup competition in 1978. In their first year they made the semi-finals, and were defeated by the overall competition winners, Eastern Suburbs. They remained into the competition until the early 1980s. In 1987, an Auckland side toured Great Britain and claimed wins over powerhouse clubs Leeds and Wigan.

In 1988, serious investigation into an Auckland team entering the New South Wales Rugby League premiership commenced, encouraged mainly by the Mount Albert club. On 17 May 1992, the announcement stating an Auckland-based team's entry into the Australian Rugby League competition, the Winfield Cup in 1995, was made. This followed very good turnouts to a number of NSWRL club games played in Auckland. The new team was to be called the Auckland Warriors and run by the Auckland Rugby League organisation. The original colours selected were blue, white, red and green. Blue and white are recognised as the colours of Auckland, while red and green were the colours of the Warriors' original sponsor, DB Bitter. The original logo was designed by Francis Allan, of Colenso.

The First Season - 1995

The coach of the new team would be former Parramatta and Wigan coach John Monie. A number of senior players were signed, such as Greg Alexander and Andy Platt. Captain Dean Bell was a high-performing signing. Former Rugby union players such as John Kirwan and Marc Ellis were brought in, in later years.

The Warriors' first year in the Australian Rugby League was 1995. Their debut match was against the Brisbane Broncos on 10 March 1995 in front of 30,000 people at a newly refurbished Mount Smart Stadium. The Warriors led 22–10 at one point in the second half of the match, however Brisbane defeated the new club 25–22.

A home crowd attendance record of 32,174 was set at Mount Smart Stadium in Round 6 of the 1995 ARL season, a record that was not topped until Round 1 of the 2011 NRL season.

The Warriors were deducted two competition points for an interchange error. In a match against Western Suburbs, the Warriors used five interchange players instead of the allowed four. The Warriors won the match comfortably, 46–12. This error had disastrous consequences for the club, as they ultimately missed the finals by two competition points. The season saw the debut of future star, Stacey Jones, who scored a try on debut in a 40–4 rout of Parramatta in Sydney. The biggest issue with the season was the lack of consistency, that is evident with the Warriors even today, despite a six match winning streak late in the season. It was observed that when the Warriors were not winning by 20 points they were losing by 20 points.

Second Year Blues - 1996

The Australian Rugby League season 1996 could have been regarded as a better one for the Warriors. The Warriors found themselves siding with the Super League during the Super League War when the New Zealand Rugby League signed up to the rebel competition. They claimed their first 'victory' over Brisbane in round one of the competition that year, after all Super League clubs agreed to boycott the first round of the competition in protest. The Warriors won the two points when they travelled to Brisbane with a squad of players that were unsigned to Super League, forcing the Broncos to forfeit the match.

With four rounds remaining the Warriors were in sixth place in the competition, seemingly headed for a finals berth. They proceeded to lose all four matches to tumble out of the finals. The only positives were that young New Zealand talents Stacey Jones and Joe Vagana had superb seasons.

Super League War – 1997

The Warriors spent 1997 in the breakaway Super League Telstra Cup competition. Despite the reduced number of teams, they failed to make an impression on the competition. Monie was replaced by Frank Endacott as coach midway through the 1997 season. The only positive was the team's performance in the World Club Challenge. The Warriors hammered United Kingdom powerhouses Wigan and St Helens, and comfortably handled Warrington. The Warriors were knocked out in the semi-finals by eventual winners Brisbane, going down 16–22.

Beginning of the NRL Era - 1998

The first season of the reformed competition was a year that saw few highlights for the club. It was readily apparent that the club needed a new approach and attitude. Fortunately for them, they were in a better position than the other two clubs that joined the competition in 1995.

The Tainui Era – 1999

Former Kiwi Mark Graham took over as coach in 1999. The club was sold off to a consortium that included ex-Kiwi coach Graham Lowe and the Tainui tribe. The club again disappointed on field, but a mid season ultimatum saw a strong finish to the season, with the side winning five of their last six games. The signs appeared promising for the new millennium.

Financial Collapse and Reinvention – 2000

In National Rugby League season 2000 the Warriors could only finish second last. This season included the Warriors' largest ever loss in their history to date, 54–0 to St. George Illawarra in Wollongong. Alarmingly, the problems off-field overshadowed the on-field problems. The majority shareholders were under intense financial pressure, and the club's future was looking bleak at best. The key assets of the club were purchased by business tycoon Eric Watson. This did not include player contracts, and many players were released and had to fight to get the money they had been promised. Ultimately only 10 players from the 2000 season were retained.

The club was re-branded as the New Zealand Warriors, with new colours of black and grey – resembling the national sporting colours. New coach Daniel Anderson and CEO Mick Watson focused on signing unknown New Zealand talent. There were only six Australians in the 2001 squad, and only three foundation players – Monty Betham, Stacey Jones and Logan Swann.

First Finals Series – 2001

In a season where the re-branded New Zealand Warriors were tipped to finish in second-last place behind the North Queensland Cowboys, the team surprised all, qualifying for their first ever finals appearance in the National Rugby League season 2001.

The Warriors were involved in Round 8 in one of the biggest near-comebacks in the history of the NRL. Down 24–8 to Canterbury-Bankstown with under six minutes remaining, the Warriors rattled off three tries in as many sets, only failing to win the match as ironically Stacey Jones missed his easiest kick of the night in the final minute.

After a mid season struggle, the Warriors upset the runaway minor premiers Parramatta 29–18 at home, in what was a highlight match.

Then, with their season on the line, the team won four matches in a row, starting with impressive 34–8, 30–0, and 14–8 home victories over fellow finals-bound teams Canterbury, Cronulla and the Sydney Roosters. The Warriors also scored 24 unanswered points in the final quarter to beat the Panthers 48–32. Their first finals appearance was sealed with a bruising 24–24 draw with the Storm at Colonial Stadium (now Marvel Stadium), but the effects of this bruising match was seen a week later, as the Warriors were beaten by 30–18 at home by the Cowboys, a win that saw the North Queenslanders avoiding the wooden spoon.

On a hiding to nothing heading into their first ever finals appearance, they were hammered by the Minor Premiers, the Parramatta Eels 56–12. The loss was at the time the largest in finals series history, but at last things seemed to be going in the right direction at the Warriors.

Minor Premiership and Grand Final – 2002

 The Warriors reached their zenith to date in the National Rugby League season 2002. They won the Minor Premiership, finishing in first place at the conclusion of the regular season after Canterbury lost 37 competition points late in the season due to severe salary cap breaches. The club played what stands as the first finals match to have been held outside Australia at Mt Smart Stadium in the first week of the Finals Series. The Warriors would defeat their bogey side Canberra 36–20 after surviving an early scare.

For the Preliminary Final against the Cronulla-Sutherland Sharks at Stadium Australia the Warriors' sponsors, such as Vodafone New Zealand and Eric Watson, purchased 15,000 tickets and gave them away for free to anyone with a New Zealand passport. Reportedly, in the 45,000 crowd there were more Warriors supporters than Cronulla supporters – astonishing considering Cronulla are a Sydney-based club. The Warriors went on to win 16–10 with John Carlaw scoring a famous try after latching onto a pinpoint Stacey Jones grubber-kick.

The Grand Final against the Sydney Roosters was a tight match for the first hour. The Warriors trailed 2–6 at half time, but took a lead just after halftime when Jones scored a great grand final try – as he left defenders sprawling in his wake on a 40-metre run to the try line. The Roosters ran away with the match in the final 20 minutes after captain Brad Fittler was involved in a head clash with Warriors prop Richard Villasanti. The final score was an unflattering 8–30.

Top-eight Again – 2003

2003 was another quite successful year for the Warriors.

After blowing an early 16–0 lead to lose 26–36 to the Newcastle Knights in Round 1, the Warriors embarked on a five-match winning streak to announce themselves as contenders for the season. However, the Warriors then struggled through the middle-stages of the season, squandering a 26–12 lead with eight minutes remaining to lose to the Parramatta Eels dramatically 28–26 at Parramatta Stadium. There was also an insipid 10–30 loss in Townsville to the North Queensland. They played their first ever extra time match, defeating South Sydney 31–30, recovering from a 6–24 deficit.

On the back of inspired play by prop Richard Villasanti, the Warriors secured their playoff spot, ultimately finishing sixth on points differential, a dangerous position to finish, as the 6th-placed finishers had been eliminated after the first week of the playoffs in the past three seasons.

Their first finals match was against Canterbury at the Sydney Showground (now Giants Stadium). The Warriors turned on one of their finest performances ever, stunning the Bulldogs early to lead 16–4 at halftime, and after a Canterbury comeback tied the scores at 16-all, scoring five tries in 16 minutes to blow the Bulldogs away, eventually winning 48–22. Winger Francis Meli scored five tries, a finals record. This prompted Graham Lowe, a known critic of the Warriors to say that the Warriors would win the premiership. The next week a Stacey Jones field-goal in the dying minutes got the Warriors past a gallant Canberra Raiders 17–16. They however lost in the Preliminary Final to the Minor Premiers and eventual Premiers Penrith Panthers, 20–28. It was a disappointing loss for the Warriors, who did not lead at any point of the match, and blew their chance early in the second half to take their first lead, when Henry Fa'afili lost the ball with the line wide open.

The Worst Year Yet – 2004

Before the National Rugby League season 2004 started, there were predictions of the Warriors having a highly successful season. These were proved wrong, as the Warriors managed to only win six games to finish equal last, only escaping the wooden spoon by having a superior points differential to South Sydney. Coach Daniel Anderson resigned mid-season after an embarrassing 52-point loss to the Sydney Roosters. His assistant Tony Kemp was given the head coach position, and in his first game in charge the Warriors recorded an emotional 20–14 win over Canberra. A week later, the Warriors' first match in Christchurch since 1996 was a flop, as the Warriors were destroyed by the Wests Tigers 4–50. The season finished with an embarrassing six-game losing streak.

The management looked to rescue a poor year with some high-profile signings. Canterbury captain Steve Price was signed, as was Kiwis captain Ruben Wiki, North Queensland half Nathan Fien and Roosters winger Todd Byrne.

The Rebuilding Begins – 2005

2005 was an improvement over the horror scenes of 2004. The team remained competitive for all of their matches, and their largest loss was only 18 points. The team had a good chance to make the finals, however a four match losing streak late in the season removed those chances. The season was tinged with sadness, as it was announced it would be star halfback Stacey Jones last season with the club before he would join French Super League club, Catalans Dragons. His last match for the team against Manly at Brookvale Oval was a fine way for him to sign off with the club as he scored the match-winning try with three minutes to go in a 22–20 victory.

At the end of the season the structure of the team was reviewed. CEO Mick Watson resigned and was replaced by Wayne Scurrah. Tony Kemp was sacked as coach and his assistant Ivan Cleary replaced him as head coach.

The Salary Cap Drama – 2006

National Rugby League season 2006 got off to a bad start for the club. In February, the Warriors were found to have committed major breaches of the salary cap in 2005. This followed the high-profile signings of Steve Price and Ruben Wiki. On 27 February the NRL announced the club would be deducted four competition points and the club would also be fined A$430,000.

Even before the penalty the Warriors were expected to struggle and were being picked as wooden spooners in some quarters. With the four-point deduction, the Warriors won their first NRL game away from Auckland, with a 26–10 victory over the reigning premiers, the Wests Tigers, at Jade Stadium in Christchurch.

On 25 June the Warriors recorded their largest ever win, defeating South Sydney 66–0 at Stadium Australia, as part of a four-match winning streak that claimed the scalps of the Sydney Roosters, Newcastle Knights, and also the Penrith Panthers. This streak was ended in an 18–22 golden-point loss to the Bulldogs, in a game where the Warriors surrendered an early 16–0 lead.

The Warriors finished the season on a positive note leaving room for optimism for 2007 and beyond. They caused arguably the upset of the season, defeating the Minor Premiers Melbourne 24–20 at Olympic Park Stadium in Melbourne, preventing the Storm from going the full regular season unbeaten at home.

Impressively, it took the Warriors 24 weeks to be completely out of finals contention. The Warriors finished winning eight of their final twelve games, including a 42–16 thrashing of the Roosters in Round 25, which included four tries by Jerome Ropati. Had the Warriors not suffered the four-point deduction, they would have finished in eighth place on the ladder, and hence would have taken part in the finals series. As it was, they finished tenth on the ladder.

There were a number of revelations in the squad. Unheralded halfback Grant Rovelli was a standout performer. Winger Patrick Ah Van has cemented a first grade spot and impressed many with his performances, while George Gatis and Nathan Fien were fine performers at hooker, and centre Simon Mannering has been one of the Warriors most impressive backs.

Return to the Finals – 2007

The Warriors completed their pre-season with two wins from three games, defeating the Auckland Lions 64–4, losing to the North Queensland Cowboys 32–14 and defeating the Canterbury-Bankstown Bulldogs 36–6.

The Warriors finished the 2007 season in fourth place. The season began with a 34–18 victory over Parramatta at Mt Smart Stadium. The following week the side created history by winning their first two games of the season with a 24–14 victory over premiers, the Brisbane Broncos – the first time they have ever won their opening two games of the season.

After a good start which saw the team sitting in fourth place with a 4–2 win–loss record, the team hit a period of indifferent form, falling into a six match losing streak following a last minute win over South Sydney. The team returned to form, defeating Cronulla 12–2 in wild weather at Toyota Park. Following that victory the side won 9 out of 12 games, with one draw. The Warriors clinched a playoff spot with a 36–14 win over an understrength Manly side, and claimed a home final the following week, defeating the Penrith Panthers 24–20 at CUA Stadium in Round 25.

The Warriors, by virtue of finishing the regular season in fourth place, won the right to host one of the finals matches in the first week of the playoffs. However, the Warriors narrowly went down to the Parramatta Eels 12–10 at Mount Smart Stadium, and their season ended with an awful 12–49 loss to the Cowboys in Townsville.

On 30 May the Warriors signed Australian Kangaroos' centre, Brent Tate from 2008 to 2010 in what was described as a "major coup" for the New Zealand club.

Second-Half Revival – 2008

The 2008 season did not start as brightly for the club, losing Wade McKinnon for much of the year during a pre-season loss to Newcastle, and losing captain Steve Price (rugby league) for ten weeks, as well as injuries to other key players Manu Vatuvei, Jerome Ropati and Michael Witt. The team remained in contention for much of the season, however often performed very poorly away from Mt Smart Stadium, and suffered their first loss to South Sydney (28–35) since 1999, and went on to lose to South Sydney again later in the season (16–18). Despite poor results away, strong home form and a now common revival in the second half of the season saw the Warriors make the top eight for the second season running, incredibly despite spending only three weeks in the top eight all season. A top-eight berth was secured in the last game of the season, when the Warriors defeated the Parramatta Eels 28–6 at Parramatta Stadium, marking the first time since 1995 that the Warriors had won away to Parramatta.

With nothing to lose in the first week of the finals, the Warriors caused arguably the greatest finals upset ever, and arguably greatest victory in the history of the club, defeating the Melbourne Storm 18–15 at Olympic Park; in doing so, they became the first 8th placed team to beat the minor premiers, with Michael Witt scoring two minutes from full-time to clinch the win. Witt taunted Melbourne captain, Cameron Smith, before placing the ball for the historic victory.

In week two of the playoffs, the Warriors came from behind to defeat the Sydney Roosters 30–13 at Mt. Smart Stadium. The Sydney Roosters led 13–6 at halftime before a second-half comeback saw the Warriors pile on twenty-four unanswered points to earn the Warriors a place in the preliminary finals. This was the first time since 2003 that the Warriors have reached the grand final qualifier, and third overall in 14 seasons. They however went down heavily to an inspired Manly-Warringah Sea Eagles 32–6.

Tragedy Strikes - 2009

2009 started with the loss of young up-and-comer Sonny Fai, who tragically drowned at Bethells Beach, near Auckland. He had gone into dangerous surf to rescue some relatives but was probably sucked under by a rip. Almost as if using the occurrence as an inhibitor, the Warriors had a very disappointing year, despite winning the opening two rounds against eventual grand finalists Parramatta Eels 26–18 and reigning premiers Manly-Warringah Sea Eagles.

After those great wins they proceeded to win a poor 1 of 8 games including a draw.
They did however manage to beat West Tigers 14–0 and Newcastle 13–0 keeping both opponents scoreless, but it was the poor attacking that had every league fan questioning. and ultimately saw them lose their next 3 matches by heavy scores. They did beat the Roosters 30–24 at SFS and Raiders 34–20 at Mt Smart Stadium. But in the end the Warriors lost their final two games against the Bulldogs in Hazem El Masri's last home game [before the finals] and ultimately ended their poor season in a bad way losing 0–30 to the eventual premiers Melbourne Storm.

Return to finals football – 2010

Expectations were not high for the Warriors in 2010 after a disappointing 2009 season. The Warriors bolstered their playing stocks in the pivotal play-making positions by signing Brett Seymour after he was cut by Cronulla and James Maloney from Melbourne. In arguably one of their best ever performances they humbled the Brisbane Broncos 48–16 at Suncorp Stadium in Round 3, with Maloney tying a club-record with 28 points (3 tries and 8 goals). Kevin Locke scored a hat-trick in the Warriors miraculous 20–18 win over the Sydney Roosters at AMI Stadium in Christchurch, narrowly escaping a serious hip injury after a high-speed collision with the goal-post (in the process of scoring the game-winning try). The Warriors won five matches in a row for the first time since late in the 2003 season and finished in 5th position in the regular season. They were knocked out of the finals series in the first week, losing to Gold Coast Titans.

Another Grand Final – 2011

2011 started out as emotional for the Warriors, due to the 2011 Christchurch Earthquake. The Warriors began the 2011 season with an historic match at Auckland's Eden Park, the first regular season home game the club had played away from Mt Smart Stadium. The match drew a record home game crowd for the Warriors of 38,405 however unfortunately the Warriors could not repay the large crowd with a victory as they were beaten 24–18 by the Parramatta Eels. The Warriors went on to lose their following two matches and it appeared that Warriors fans were in for another season of disappointment. To their credit the Warriors bounced back and were in the running for a top four position late in the season but finished in 6th spot. Midway through the season coach Ivan Cleary was approached by the Penrith Panthers and was appointed as their coach for the 2012 season. Cleary remained coach for the remainder of the 2011 season and Brian McClennan was to be appointed his successor for the 2012 season. One of the highlights of the season was the unearthing of the young halfback Shaun Johnson who played a key role as the Warriors approached the 2011 finals series.

In week one of the finals series the Warriors were thrashed 40–10 by the Brisbane Broncos. Other results went the Warriors way and they were fortunate to progress to week two of the finals where they would meet a high flying Wests Tigers who had completed their 9th straight victory. The match was expected to go the Tigers way however a brilliant second half comeback by the Warriors culminated in a late and controversial try to Krisnan Inu which saw the Warriors win 22–20 and earn the right to play the Melbourne Stormfor a place in the Grand Final.

The Warriors traveled to Melbourne as outsiders but turned in what is considered one of the most complete performances in the club's history. The Warriors controlled the match and sealed the Melbourne Storm's fate with Shaun Johnson mesmerising the Storm defence to send Lewis Brown in for the try that would send the Warriors to their second ever Grand Final, where they would meet the Manly-Warringah Sea Eagles.

The Warriors would again start the match as heavy underdogs and with a side boasting only three players who had previously played in a Grand Final (Manly on the other hand could boast their coach and eight players who had won the 2008 NRL premiership with the club, plus another who had won a premiership in 2003 with Penrith). Heavy defence from both sides was the feature until the Warriors opened the scoring with a penalty goal to James Maloney in the 28th minute, but a little more than a minute after the restart, a bad read in defence saw prolific try scorer Brett Stewart in for the 1st try. Just before the break, the Warriors were then unlucky not to receive a penalty for obstruction in the lead up to Manly's second try which saw them go into the sheds down 12–2. A further try to Clive Churchill Medal winner Glenn Stewart in the 57th minute saw Manly's lead out to 18–2. The Warriors refused to die however, and clawed their way back with tries to Manu Vatuvei and Elijah Taylor in the 63rd and 68th minutes. Unfortunately Maloney missed both conversions which could have taken the score to 18–14 and a grandstand finish, but a try to Manly captain Jamie Lyon with only a minute remaining put the result beyond doubt as the Warriors were beaten by a clinical Manly outfit 24–10 – yet their effort in reaching just their second ever Grand Final (and their first in nine years) was a triumph for the club and departing coach Ivan Cleary and won praise from those in the NRL.

2011 was a successful season all-round for the New Zealand Warriors, with all three grades reaching the Grand Final. The club's NYC team defeated the North Queensland Cowboys 31–30 in golden point extra time in the NYCGrand Final to win their second premiership, while NSW Cup affiliate the Auckland Vulcans went down 30–28 after conceding a last minute try to Canterbury-Bankstown in the NSW Cup Grand Final.

Grand Final Hangover – 2012

2012 was meant to promise so much for the Warriors following their grand final appearance of 2011. A new coach with a successful track record in Brian 'Bluey' McClennan, a stable squad and strong public support indicated that 2012 could have been the year they finally broke their premiership duck. The season again kicked off with a home game at Eden Park, with a strong crowd of 37,502 witnessing the Warriors go down 20–26 to Manly in a grand final rematch. The match was perhaps an indication of things to come, with the Warriors performing strongly on attack but being let down by weak defence at crucial stages which ultimately cost them the match.

The season did not improve much from that point, with the Warriors failing to find any semblance of consistency throughout the season. There were some highs, such as their 44–22 drubbing of South Sydney, but these were far outweighed by the deep lows. Their season is best summed up by a dismal month of football between Rounds 20 and 23. The Warriors surrendered 19- and 18-nil leads in succession and lost (a first in the history of the game), before leaking 97 points in their next two defeats. In the process they lost all semblance of a quality rugby league team.

Injuries were not kind to the Warriors, with the side using 29 players over the course of the season – the second highest of any team in the NRL. The Warriors season unravelled over the latter rounds. Ultimately Brian McClennan was sacked with three rounds remaining, with assistant coach Tony Iro taking over the reins for the final two rounds. The change of coach did not result in a change of fortunes however, as the Warriors limped out of the season with an eight match long losing streak – a club record.

Following a lengthy search for a new coach former Penrith and Canberra boss Matthew Elliott was appointed as head coach in October 2012.

A year under Matt Elliott – 2013

Another horror start for the Warriors in 2013 as they win just 2 of their opening 10 games. The Warriors came back into finals contention winning 7 games out of 8 including a 56–18 win against the Brisbane Broncos in Brisbane. As finals approached the Warriors ended with just 2 wins from their remaining 6 games to see them finish the season 11th. In Round 10, on 18 May the Warriors lost 6–62 to the Penrith Panthers which was their largest ever loss in the club's history. Captain Simon Mannering won the club's Player of the year and Ngani Laumape won Rookie of the year.

In September, after months of speculation, the Warriors confirmed the signing of former Man of Steel winner Sam Tomkins on a three year deal from English club Wigan Warriors for a record transfer fee of $1,000,000 NZD.

Third year since grand final; third head coach – 2014

In the First edition of the NRL Auckland Nines, The Warriors were favourites to win. They finished top of their pool winning all three games but lost the semi-final to eventual winners North Queensland Cowboys. The Warriors started the season two wins and two losses but in Round 5 after a 37–6 loss to Cronulla-Sutherland Sharks the club sacked head coach Matthew Elliott replacing him former Canberra Raiders player Andrew McFadden. Unfortunately the Warriors missed the playoffs for the 3rd season in a row after missing out on points difference to the Brisbane Broncos. Simon Mannering won his 4th Player of the year award, while David Fusitu'a won Rookie of the year.

A year of McFadden; some success, then the losses mount – 2015

The 2015 season marked 20 years since the Warriors first joined the Australian professional rugby league now known as the NRL. 

The Warriors were knocked out in the quarter-finals of the 2015 NRL Auckland Nines by eventual runners up Cronulla-Sutherland Sharks.

Warriors ended the season with eight consecutive loses after Shaun Johnson broke his ankle while scoring a try against Manly-Warringah Sea Eagles in Round 20.  Ben Matulino was named club Player of the year with Tuimoala Lolohea named club Rookie of the year.

Big name signings; big year of disappointment – 2016

To start off, there was plenty of hype around the Warriors camp about 2016 being the season where they would finally win the Premiership, after the major signings of 2015 Dally M Fullback of the Year Roger Tuivasa-Sheck, from the Sydney Roosters and Kiwi international Issac Luke, from the South Sydney Rabbitohs. The Warriors came runners up in the 2016 NRL Auckland Nines, losing to the Parramatta Eels in the final, 22–4. The Warriors started the season in the worst possible way, losing their first three matches. The Warriors beat the Newcastle Knights 40–18 to record their first win of the season and then defeated the Sydney Roosters in a Golden Point thriller in Gosford a week later. After the embarrassing loss to Melbourne Storm on Anzac Day, the team came under intense scrutiny with many calling for the sacking of coach, Andrew McFadden. As well as this, six Warriors players where stood down after mixing prescription drugs with energy drinks. This scandal did not help the club who were already struggling. After 11 rounds, the Warriors stood at four wins from 11 games. As State of Origin came into effect, the Warriors started to elevate their performance. Winning four from five games, with the exception being a golden point loss to the table-topping Cronulla-Sutherland Sharks. After Round 18, the Warriors were in the top eight and needing only to win four out of their final eight games with three of their final four games on home turf. An achievable target, however the club recorded just two wins from their final eight games to finish tenth on the ladder and for the fifth year in a row, missed out on finals. Simon Mannering received his fifth Warriors Player of the Year.

On 12 September 2016 it was announced that Kiwis coach Stephen Kearney would replace Andrew McFadden as head coach for 2017.

Another dismal year – 2017

After the restructuring of the Warriors coaching staff and with the signing of Kieran Foran, there was much anticipation leading into the season for the team. The Auckland Nines were perhaps a sign of things to come as the Warriors were left win-less and at the bottom of their pool. They kicked off the regular season with a narrow victory over the Newcastle Knights. It would be one of few wins for the 2017 season. Heading into their first bye of the season, they had just won six from 14 games. Worse was yet to come. After that bye, they defeated the Canterbury-Bankstown Bulldogs at Mt Smart Stadium in what would turn out to be their last win of the season. After that, the Warriors would go on a losing streak until the season's end, creating a club record of nine straight losses and one of the worst seasons in the club's history. As well as this, notable names such as Ryan Hoffman, Jacob Lillyman, Charlie Gubb and Kieran Foran had left the club. After so much promise and hype leading up to the championship, it seemed to have been all too familiar for Warriors fans. So much so, during a school visit in September, after their season had ended, one student asked them why they were "so bad", while another, who had little knowledge of rugby league, asked them where they finished on the competition ladder.

In December 2017, the New Zealand Warriors expressed their interest in applying for a licence to participate in the inaugural NRL Women's season.

End of finals drought – 2018

After a dismal 2017 season, the Warriors made a few key signings. This included experienced New Zealand Internationals Gerard Beale, Adam Blair, Tohu Harris & Peta Hiku. Significantly it also included veteran journeyman playmaker Blake Green, along with Agnatius Paasi, Leivaha Pulu, Anthony Gelling & Karl Lawton. In the beginning of the year, many people tipped that the Warriors would finish last, and claim their first wooden spoon in history. But surprisingly enough, the Warriors began the season with five straight wins, their best ever start to a season, which included away wins over the Sydney Roosters, Canberra Raiders & the South Sydney Rabbitohs, marking their first win in Perth from numerous attempts. They ended up finishing 8th, but only two competition points out of 4th in one of the closest top 8's in NRL History, they played Penrith Panthers in an elimination final on Saturday 8 September at Stadium Australia. This was their first finals series appearance since 2011, but lost to Penrith 27–12.

In April 2018, the Warriors would be sold by long-time owner, Eric Watson, to the Carlaw Heritage Trust and Autex Industries, for $16 million NZD.

To top off the year, Roger Tuivasa-Sheck won the Dally M Medal, becoming the first Warriors player to do so, and the Warriors would become one of four inaugural teams in the NRLW.

This would also be the end of Shaun Johnson's first stint at the Warriors.

A disappointing 25th season – 2019

The club celebrated its 25th season in top level Rugby League in 2019 by returning to their original jersey and colours, as well as modifying their logo close to their original 1995 logo (with Auckland being replaced by New Zealand). The season got off to a near-perfect start for the Warriors, defeating the Canterbury-Bankstown Bulldogs 40–6 at home, which was played the day after the 2019 Christchurch Mosque Shootings. But then things started to go downhill for the club losing heavily in their next two games against the Tigers (34–6), and the Sea Eagles (46–12). A 26–10 win over the Gold Coast Titans at home gave the club hope that 2019 would be as successful as 2018 as, but four straight losses, including close losses against South Sydney in Round 5 (28–24), and a controversial loss to the Melbourne club on Anzac Day (13–12) almost wrote off any chance of another finals appearance. The Warriors then won their next two games against St. George Illawarra (26–18), and Penrith (30–10), but they were unable to win at home, holding a six-game losing streak at Mt Smart, which was finally broken in their shock 24–16 win over Manly in Round 21. But after the win over Manly-Warringah, the Warriors were beaten by the Sydney Roosters 42–6, Cronulla-Sutherland 42–16 and South Sydney 31–10 ending any chance of another finals appearance. However, they were able to end the season on a positive note, beating the 4th placed Canberra 24–20 in Canberra.

After just 16 months of joint ownership, Autex Industries would become the sole-owner of the team after buying out the 66% share in the Warriors owned by the Carlaw Heritage Trust

COVID-19 impacts the NRL – 2020

Going into the 2020 NRL season, the Warriors were looking to improve on their dismal 2019 campaign. However, even before kick off of their first-round game against the Newcastle Knights, New Zealand Prime Minister Jacinda Ardern announced that people traveling into New Zealand would be subject to a mandatory self-isolation period of 14 days due to the COVID-19 pandemic, this not only meant that the Warriors would have to self isolate for 14 days and not play should they return home, but it would be nearly impossible to accommodate visiting sides. As a consequence the Warriors-based themselves in the Northern New South Wales town of Kingscliff and moved their round 2 game on 21 March against the Canberra Raiders to Cbus Super Stadium on the Gold Coast. Two days after the Raiders game, the NRL suspended the competition, with the aim to resume a shortened season to be held over 20 rounds (including the first two rounds that have already taken place) by 28 May. When the competition resumed, the Warriors started their new campaign on a perfect note, in a memorable 18–0 win over St. George Illawarra at their temporary home at Central Coast Stadium. On 20 June, the day after an embarrassing 40–12 loss to South Sydney, the Warriors sacked Stephen Kearney as coach with former Wests Tigers premiership player Todd Payten taking over as caretaker coach. However, despite some of their bad performances, they did improve in the second half of the season with back to back wins over the Wests Tigers (26-20) and Manly (26-22) and were gallant in their loss to the Sydney Roosters (18-10). The Warriors ended up finishing 10th, and saw 2020 as a year of success despite not qualifying for the finals. They flew home on 28 September following their 40–28 win over Manly-Warringah.

Another season based in Australia – 2021

Before the 2021 season, the Warriors signed former St. George Illawarra and Newcastle Knights coach Nathan Brown as head coach. Despite having to be based on the Central Coast again due to a lack of a travel bubble between Australia and New Zealand, the Warriors went into the new season with optimism, firstly, the Warriors upset a star studded Gold Coast 19–6 in their season opener at Gosford. The following week, Newcastle narrowly beat the Warriors 16–20 and were largely written off for their round 3 clash against Canberra at GIO Stadium, after trailing 31–10 at the 48 minute mark, the Warriors produced their biggest ever comeback scoring  24 unanswered points to win 34–31. 

On Easter Sunday, the Sydney Roosters beat the Warriors 32–12 at the Sydney Cricket Ground despite the Warriors being in touch in the first half and would the following week let Manly-Warringah in for their first win of the season losing by a Daly Cherry-Evans field goal to record their 2nd loss by less than 6 points in 4 weeks. On 6 April, it was announced that the Trans Tasman bubble had opened two ways, but due to risks that the borders could close and the Warriors and any away team travelling to New Zealand could be stuck there and the NRL could be suspended, the Warriors decided to base themselves in Gosford for the entire year. The Warriors did record some impressive victories since the announcement, upsetting St. George Illawarra in Kogarah 20-14, holding on to beat North Queensland 24-20 in Gosford and winning a thriller to beat the Wests Tigers 30-26 also played in Gosford. Unfortunately for the Warriors, it would be another year where they didn't make the finals, as they had a seven-game losing streak between Rounds 12 to 19 and lost their last three games, including a horrible 44-0 loss to the Gold Coast which was labelled as their worst performance of the season.

Worst ever season, return to New Zealand – 2022

The Warriors began their season with two close losses with defeats against St. George Illawarra in Round 1 (28-16) and the Gold Coast Titans in Round 2 (20-18). Before going on to win their next three matches, beating the Wests Tigers (16-12), Brisbane (20-6) and North Queensland (25-24). However that streak came to an end when they suffered a controversial loss to the Sydney Roosters in Round 6 (22-14). After the Roosters game, the Warriors went on to lose eight of their next nine games including humiliating defeats to Cronulla in Round 9 (29-10) in a game where the Cronulla side were reduced to 11 players and a 70-10 loss to Melbourne on ANAZC Day which is the clubs biggest loss in their history.

On 3 July, the Warriors returned home to play at Mt Smart Stadium in New Zealand for the first time in almost three years. They hosted the Wests Tigers in front of a sold-out crowd of 26,009. They would go on to win the match by a score of 22-2, breaking a 7 game losing streak. In the Warriors remaining three home games of the season, the Warriors would go on to lose to the Melbourne Storm 24-12, where winger Ed Kosi scored the only points for the Warriors with 3 tries in his just his second game since being dropped after the Warriors record breaking loss to the Storm earlier in the season, win against the Canterbury-Bankstown Bulldogs 42-18, the teams biggest win since 2016, and lose to the Gold Coast Titans 27-26 in extra time of the final game of the season, after surrendering a 14 point lead in the final 7 minutes of the match.

In September 2022, the Warriors principal sponsor Vodafone New Zealand announced they would change their name to One New Zealand, as they are also naming rights sponsor, the Warriors subsequently announced they would change their name to the One New Zealand Warriors from November 2022 onwards.

Season summaries

Finals Appearances
8 (2001, 2002, 2003, 2007, 2008, 2010, 2011, 2018)

2023 Squad

2023 Signings & Transfers

IN

OUT

Contracts

♦ = Player/Coach is contracted for that season

PLAYERS

COACHES

Captains
There have been 25 captains of the Warriors since their first season in 1995.
The current captain is Tohu Harris.

Coaches
There have been 14 coaches of the Warriors since their first season in 1995.
The current coach is Andrew Webster.

Kits

Sponsors

Individual records and awards

* indicates player still active for Warriors

Simon Mannering Medal 
 Called 'Player of the Year' until 2018; named after the club's most capped player, Simon Mannering as of 2019.

Rookie of the Year
 Named 'Young Player of the Year' until 2013.

Dally M Awards

The Dally M Awards are the official annual player awards for the National Rugby League competition.

^^ Awarded to the entire team and staff for the sacrifices made in relocating to Australia during the COVID-19 impacted season.

Most games

Most tries

Most tries in a season

Most points

Most points in a season

Most points in a match

Club records

Biggest wins

Biggest losses

Kept opposition to nil

Kept to nil

Most consecutive wins

Most consecutive losses

Most consecutive home wins

Most consecutive away wins

Most consecutive home losses

Most consecutive away losses

Biggest comeback
Recovered from a 21-point deficit.
 Trailed Canberra Raiders 31–10 after 51 minutes to win 34–31 at GIO Stadium on 27 March 2021

Worst collapse
Surrendered a 26-point lead.
 Led Penrith Panthers 32–6 after 59 minutes to draw 32–32 at CUA Stadium on 1 August 2009

Surrendered an 18-point lead (three-times).
 Led Wests Tigers 22–4 after 64 minutes to lose 26–22 at Mount Smart Stadium on 12 June 2011
 Led Newcastle Knights 18–0 after 16 minutes to lose 24–19 at Mount Smart Stadium on 21 July 2012
 Led Manly-Warringah Sea Eagles 18–0 after 31 minutes to lose 24–22 at Patersons Stadium on 28 July 2012

Surrendered a 16-point lead (three-times).
 Led Newcastle Knights 16–0 after 34 minutes to lose 36–26 at Mount Smart Stadium on 16 March 2003
 Led Canterbury Bulldogs 16–0 after 21 minutes to lose 22–18 (in extra-time) at Stadium Australia on 9 July 2006
 Led Canberra Raiders 22–6 after 45 minutes to lose 22–42 at Mount Smart Stadium on 2 September 2012

Golden Point Record

Largest home attendances
Largest attendances at the four venues used as home grounds.
 38,405 – vs Parramatta Eels at Eden Park on 12 March 2011
 37,502 – vs Manly-Warringah Sea Eagles at Eden Park on 4 March 2012
 32,740 – vs Sydney Roosters at Eden Park on 16 March 2013
 32,174 – vs Illawarra Steelers at Mount Smart Stadium on 16 April 1995
 30,112 – vs Manly-Warringah Sea Eagles at Mount Smart Stadium on 7 April 1995
 30,112 – vs Canterbury-Bankstown Bulldogs at Westpac Stadium on 11 May 2013

Head-to-head records

Women's team

In December 2017, the New Zealand Warriors expressed their interest in applying for a licence to participate in the inaugural NRL Women's Premiership. In March 2018, they were awarded one of four licences for the league's inaugural season, to commence in September of the same year. Luisa Avaiki was named the coach of the side.

The team competed in, and finished 3rd place in both the 2018 and 2019 seasons, the latter of which included the first ever standalone NRLW match held at Mount Smart Stadium.

In the 2020 season, because of COVID-19, the team was forced to field a side which only included five players from the previous season, with the rest of the team being Australian players.  The team was coached by Australia women's national rugby league team coach, Brad Donald. The side came in third place (from four) for the third consecutive year.

In June 2021, CEO Cameron George announced the team would not compete in the 2021 competition but plan to re-enter the competition in 2022. This did not eventuate, however, with the NRL announcing NRLW expansion to 10 teams for the 2023 season that did not include the Warriors.

In August 2022, during a Members-Only meeting with CEO Cameron George, Owner Mark Robinson, Coach Stacey Jones, and Captain Tohu Harris. It was announced their intention to re-enter the competition for the 2025 Season.

See also

 National Rugby League
 Rugby league in New Zealand
 List of New Zealand Warriors players

References

External links
 New Zealand Warriors Official site
 NZWarriors.com NZ Warriors fan forum
 RL1908.com Club History

 
Rugby clubs established in 1995
1995 establishments in New Zealand
National Rugby League clubs
NRL Women's Premiership clubs
Sport in Auckland